The Byzantine civil war of 1321–1328 was a series of conflicts fought in the 1320s between the Byzantine emperor Andronikos II Palaiologos and his grandson Andronikos III Palaiologos over control of the Byzantine Empire.

Prelude to the civil war
Michael IX was the son of Andronikos II, and was co-ruler and next in line for succession. He was also the father of Andronikos III and of another son named Manuel. In 1320, Andronikos III accidentally caused the death of his brother Manuel, after which their father died in his grief. The homicide and the general dissolute behavior of Andronikos III and his coterie, mostly the young scions of the great aristocratic clans of the Empire, resulted in a deep rift in the relations between young Andronikos and his grandfather.

1321: First conflict
Andronikos III had many supporters, chief among them John Kantakouzenos and Syrgiannes Palaiologos, who bought themselves governorships in Thrace, where discontent with the old emperor was high.  On Easter 1321, Andronikos III fled the capital to Adrianople, where he set up his court and initiated an uprising against his grandfather. Syrgiannes Palaiologos led a large army towards the capital, forcing the old emperor to negotiate. On 6 June 1321 a peace agreement was concluded, whereby Andronikos III was recognized as co-emperor and assigned Thrace and districts in Macedonia, while the rest, including Constantinople, remained under Andronikos II, who, as senior emperor, would also direct the empire's foreign policy.

1322: Second conflict
The peace agreement of 1321 did not last long, as both Andronikoi pursued virtually independent foreign policies.  Within the faction of Andronikos III a rift arose between the Syrgiannes and megas domestikos John Kantakouzenos. Syrgiannes felt that he had not been sufficiently rewarded for his support, and he also resented the greater favour shown by Andronikos II to Kantakouzenos. Furthermore, there is also a story that Andronikos III attempted to seduce Syrgiannes' wife. As a result, in December 1321 Syrgiannes switched support to the old emperor, fleeing to Constantinople. Rewarded with the title of megas doux, he then convinced Andronikos II to resume the war.  After several cities in the area of Constantinople went over to the younger Andronikos, another agreement in July 1322 restored the previous status quo. This agreement between grandfather and grandson left Syrgiannes in an awkward position.  Having failed in his endeavours, he began plotting to assassinate Andronikos II and seize the throne for himself. The plot was foiled however, and Syrgiannes was sentenced to life imprisonment.

On 2 February 1325, Andronikos III was formally crowned as co-emperor by his grandfather. Although there was little fighting during this conflict, the effects had a major impact on the empire: constant troop movements from levied peasants reduced agricultural production and trade was severely interrupted.

1327–28: Third conflict
In February 1327 a new conflict occurred between Andronikos III Palaiologos and his grandfather Andronikos II Palaiologos, but this time the Balkan countries were involved in war. On Andronikos II Palaiologos' side stood the Serbian king Stefan Dečanski and on the other's Bulgarian emperor Michael Shishman, as agreed by the Treaty of Chernomen. Battles were fought for the Macedonian territories and after this victories these territories along with the city of Salonika went into hands of Andronikos III Palaiologos. In January 1328 Andronikos III Palaiologos and his commander John Kantakouzenos entered Salonika. After these victories in Macedonia, Andronikos III decided to capture Constantinopole and in May 1328 he entered into city and forced his grandfather to abdicate and took power in charge. Two years later the old emperor was taken to a monastery where he died on February 13, 1332.

With Andronikos III Palaiologos (1328–1341) came a new generation with John Kantakouzenos as leader, who was in charge of politics while Andronikos III was in charge of army. The civil war exhausted the empire, the value of money dropped, but the new government took care of law and courts.

Aftermath

See also
 List of Byzantine civil wars

Notes

Sources 

 

 

Civil War
1321
Civil War 1321
Wars involving the Second Bulgarian Empire
1320s conflicts
Wars of succession involving the states and peoples of Europe